Ángel Víctor Torres Pérez (: born 30 March 1966) is a Spanish politician who serves as the president of the Canary Islands. He is the secretary-general of the Socialist Party of the Canaries (PSC–PSOE).

Early life and education 
Born on 30 March 1966 in Arucas, in the island of Gran Canaria, Ángel Víctor Torres obtained a degree in Hispanic Philology at the University of La Laguna. He became a highschool professor of language and literature in 1991.

Career 
Torres entered politics in 1999 when he became a municipal councillor in Arucas elected in the Spanish Socialist Workers' Party (PSOE) list, serving as mayor of the municipality in two spells (2003–2007 and 2011–2015).

He served from 2009 to 2011 as member of the Congress of Deputies, taking in the vacant seat left by Juan Fernando López Aguilar in 2009, as the later was elected to the European Parliament.

He was elected as the secretary-general of the PSC–PSOE in July 2017. Following the results of the 2019 Canarian regional election (in which Torres was elected member of the Parliament of the Canary Islands), Torres (representing the PSC–PSOE) reached a deal with the leaders of the New Canaries, Sí Podemos and Gomera Socialist Group (respectively, Román Rodríguez, Noemí Santana and Casimiro Gurbelo) in June 2019 to form a regional government headed by Torres, that would oust the government of Canarian Coalition after a 26-year long rule of the Canary Islands.

References 

Members of the 9th Congress of Deputies (Spain)
Mayors of places in the Canary Islands
Members of the 10th Parliament of the Canary Islands
Presidents of the Canary Islands
1966 births
Living people